The 2015 Continental Tire Sports Car Challenge season was the series' sixteenth running and the second under the International Motor Sports Association's sanction. The Grand Sport portion was won by Andrew Davis and Robin Liddell who drove the #6 car for Stevenson Motorsports.

Schedule
Daytona International Speedway- January 23 to support the 24 Hours of Daytona
Sebring International Raceway- March 20 to support the Twelve Hours of Sebring
Mazda Raceway Laguna Seca- May 2
Watkins Glen International- June 27 to support the Six Hours of Watkins Glen
Canadian Tire Motorsport Park- July 11
Lime Rock Park- July 24/25
Road America- August 8
Virginia International Raceway- August 22
Circuit of the Americas- September 18
Road Atlanta- October 2 to support the Petit Le Mans

Unlike the United SportsCar Championship, which the series supports, no street circuits were used.

References

2015
Continental Tire Sports Car Challenge season